The Harvard T.H. Chan School of Public Health is the public health school of Harvard University, located in the Longwood Medical Area of Boston, Massachusetts. The school grew out of the Harvard-MIT School for Health Officers, the nation's first graduate training program in population health, which was founded in 1913 and then became the Harvard School of Public Health in 1922.

Harvard's T.H. Chan School of Public Health is currently ranked as the best school for public health in the world by both the Academic Ranking of World Universities and EduRank. It is also ranked as the second (tie) best public health school in the nation by U.S. News & World Report.

History
Harvard's T.H. School of Public Health traces its origins to the Harvard-MIT School for Health Officers, which was founded in 1913. Harvard calls it "the nation's first graduate training program in public health." In 1922, the School for Health Officers became the Harvard School of Public Health. 

In 1946, it was split off from Harvard Medical School and developed its own dedicated public health and medical faculty. It was renamed the Harvard T.H. Chan School of Public Health in 2014 in honor of a $350 million donation, the largest in Harvard's history at the time, from the Morningside Foundation, run by Harvard School of Public Health alumnus Gerald Chan, SM '75, SD '79, and Ronnie Chan, both of whom were sons of T.H. Chan.

Leadership
From 2009 until 2015, the dean of the Harvard T.H Chan School of Public Health was Julio Frenk, the former Mexican government's Secretary of Health from 2002 until 2006 and current president of the University of Miami.

In 2016, following Frenk's departure, Michelle Ann Williams was appointed the School's new dean.

In January 2020, The Harvard Crimson reported on an internal discussion by Harvard T.H. Chan School of Public Health faculty on whether to hold a "no confidence" vote on Williams' leadership. The newspaper reported that allegations included that "Williams has punished faculty and staff in the past for expressing dissent, creating what multiple affiliates termed a 'culture of retaliation'."

Curriculum
The Master of Public Health program offers ten fields of study:
 Clinical Effectiveness (CLE)
 Epidemiology (EPI)
 Generalist (GEN)
 Global Health and Population (GH)
 Health and Social Behavior (HSB)
 Health Management (HM)
 Health Policy (HP)
 Occupational and Environmental Health (OEH)
 Quantitative Methods (QM)
 Nutrition (NUT)

Degree programs offered by specific departments:
 Biostatistics: SM, PhD
 Environmental Health (EH): SM, MPH, PhD, DrPH
 Epidemiology (EPI): SM, DrPH
 Genetics and Complex Diseases: PhD
 Health Policy: SM, MPH, PhD
 Health Care Management: SM, MPH
 Immunology and Infectious Diseases: PhD
 Nutrition (NUT): MPH, DrPH, PhD
 Global Health and Population (GHP): SM, MPH, PhD
 Social and Behavioral Sciences (SBS): SM, MPH, PhD, DrPH
 Population Health Sciences (Interdisciplinary PhD within departments of EH, EPI, GHP, NUT, and SBS)

The Harvard Doctor of Public Health (DrPH) was launched in 2014 as a multidisciplinary degree providing advanced education in public health along with mastery of skills in management, leadership, communications, and innovation thinking. The program is a cohort-based program emphasizing small-group learning and collaboration. The program is designed for three years – two years at Harvard, plus one year in a field-based doctoral project – although some students may take up to four years to complete the program. Academic training in the DrPH covers the biological, social, and economic foundations of public health, as well as essential statistical, quantitative, and methodological skills in the first year, an individualized course of study in your second year, and a field-based, capstone project called the DELTA (Doctoral Engagement in Leadership and Translation for Action) in the final year(s) of the program.

PhD programs are offered under the aegis of the Harvard Graduate School of Arts and Sciences.

Research projects
 The Nurses' Health Study and Nurses' Health Study II, which have followed the health of over 100,000 nurses from 1976 to the present; its results have been used in hundreds of published papers.
 The Health Professionals Follow-up Study, a similar study of over fifty thousand male health professionals seeking to connect diet, exercise, smoking, and medications taken to frequency of cancer and cardiovascular disease.
 The International Health Systems Program, which has provided training or technical assistance to projects in 21 countries and conducts health policy research.
 The Program in Health Care Financing, which studies the economics of national health care programs; evaluates the health care programs of China, Hong Kong, Taiwan, and other countries; studies the effects of bringing HMO-like hospital reimbursement practices to developing countries; and applies hedonimetrics to health care.
 The Program on Humanitarian Policy and Conflict Research (HPCR), which studies public health and humanitarian law and policy in the context of conflict-torn regions like the Gaza Strip and transnational issues like terrorism.
 The Lung Cancer S.O.S. study, examining the risk factors for and prognosis of lung cancer in terms of genetics and environment.
 The College Alcohol Study, which examines the causes of college binge drinking and approaches to prevention and harm reduction.
 The Program on the Global Demography of Aging, which studies policy issues related to economics of aging with a focus on the developing world.
 The Superfund Basic Research Program (see Superfund), studying toxic waste management.
 The Lee Kum Sheung Center for Health and Happiness, to "help identify how positive aspects of living can lead to better health and a longer life" and "coordinate research across many disciplines at Harvard University" and "understanding the complex interplay between positive psychological well-being and human health."

Maternal Health Task Force

Launched in 2008 with funding from the Bill & Melinda Gates Foundation, the Maternal Health Task Force (MHTF) is a global project focused on improving maternal health through better coordination, communication, and facilitation between existing maternal health organizations, as well as with experts in related fields.  The MHTF is managed by EngenderHealth, an international nonprofit organization.

Notable faculty (and past faculty)

Joseph G. Allen, public health expert, director of the Healthy Buildings program
Katherine Baicker, economist, a former member of the Council of Economic Advisers
Robert Blendon, political strategy of health and public opinion expert
Barry Bloom, immunologist and former dean
David Bloom, economist
David Canning, economist
Douglas Dockery, epidemiologist
Francesca Dominici senior associate dean for research, professor of biostatistics, data scientist, and air pollution expert
Arnold Epstein, department chair for health policy and management
Max Essex, HIV researcher
Julio Frenk, former dean of school of public health and former Secretary of Health of Mexico
Atul Gawande, general and endocrine surgeon
Sue Goldie, physician and decision scientist, MacArthur fellowship recipient
John Graham, policy and decision scientist, former director of the Office of Information and Regulatory Affairs
Laurie Glimcher, immunologist
Alice Hamilton, occupational health and toxicology; first woman appointed to the faculty of Harvard University
David Hemenway, economist and injury prevention expert
William Hsiao, economist
Frank Hu, epidemiologist and nutrition researcher
David Hunter, epidemiologist, Acting Dean of the Faculty and former Dean for Academic Affairs at School of Public Health
Curtis Huttenhower, computational biologist
Ashish Jha (MPH'04 and former faculty) served as Dean for Global Strategy 2018–2020
Ichiro Kawachi, social epidemiologist 
Howard Koh, public health researcher, the 14th Assistant Secretary for Health at the U.S. Department of Health and Human Services.
Nan Laird, biostatistician, former head of department
Alexander H. Leighton, psychiatric epidemiologist
Richard Levins, ecologist and mathematical biologist
Xihong Lin, biostatistician and mathematician, 2006 COPPS presidents' award recipient
Jun S. Liu, biostatistician and mathematician, 2002 COPPS presidents' award recipient
Bernard Lown, co-founded the Nobel Prize-winning group Physicians for Social Responsibility; founder of the Lown Cardiovascular Research Foundation
Adetokunbo Lucas, former director of Tropical Diseases Research at the World Health Organization (WHO)
Brian MacMahon, cancer epidemiologist
Sezan Mahmud, Writer and university professor 
Christopher Murray, physician and health economist
Joseph Newhouse, economist and director of the RAND Health Insurance Experiment
Shuji Ogino, pioneer in molecular pathological epidemiology
Eric Rubin, editor-in-chief of New England Journal of Medicine
James Robins, epidemiologist and biostatistician
Pardis Sabeti,  computational biologist, medical geneticist and evolutionary geneticist
Amartya Sen, economist, Nobel laureate in Economics
Gita Sen, feminist scholar and specialist in international population policy
 Frank E. Speizer, physician and epidemiologist
Andrew Spielman, public health entomologist
Frederick J. Stare, controversial chair of Nutrition Institute
James H. Ware, biostatistician
Thomas Huckle Weller, Nobel laureate in Physiology and Medicine
George C. Whipple, cofounder of School in 1922
Walter Willett, physician and nutrition researcher

Notable alumni
There are over 13,484 alumni.

Anthony Irvine Adams, 2001 Alumni Award of Merit for a distinguished service in public health practice
James B. Aguayo-Martel, pioneer in ophthalmology
Gro Harlem Brundtland, former Prime Minister of Norway, former Director-General of the World Health Organization
Nadine Burke Harris, pediatrician and first Surgeon General of California
Eli Capilouto, twelfth president of the University of Kentucky 
William Foege, MPH 1965, physician, former Director of the Centers for Disease Control and Prevention
Mandy Cohen, physician, Secretary of the North Carolina Department of Health and Human Services
Humayun Chaudhry, President and CEO of the Federation of State Medical Boards
Winston Dang, head of Taiwan's Environmental Protection Administration from 2004 to 2008
Jonathan Fielding, Director Los Angeles County Department of Public Health, editor in chief of the Annual Review of Public Health
Janina R. Galler, PI and Director of 45+-year Barbados Nutrition Study in the Lesser Antilles, in the Americas, a longitudinal study showing the intergenerational legacy of poverty and disadvantage from childhood malnutrition.
Steven K. Galson, former Acting Surgeon General of the United States
Atul Gawande, surgical safety pioneer, MacArthur Fellow, Rhodes Scholar 
Sue Goldie, MacArthur Fellow and decision scientist 
Timothy Johnson, chief medical correspondent for ABC News 
Karl Lauterbach, German politician (SPD), served as Federal Minister of Health since 8 December 2021
Alberto P. León, MD, MPH, former Secretary of Health, Mexico
John S. Marr, MD, MPH, epidemiologist and author.
Jonathan Mann, former head of the World Health Organization global HIV/AIDS program 
James O. Mason, former Acting Surgeon General of the United States, former Director of the Centers for Disease Control and Prevention
Shuji Ogino, pioneer in molecular pathological epidemiology
Endang Rahayu Sedyaningsih, former Minister of Health of Indonesia 
David J. Sencer, longest-serving Director of the Centers for Disease Control and Prevention
Carl G. Streed, physician, researcher, and advocate for the LGBTQ+ community
Rochelle Walensky – Director, Centers for Disease Control and Prevention

References

External links

 
 Professor Andrew Speilman, Professor Tropical Public Health, Harvard School of Public Health Freeview Issues programme on Malaria by the Vega Science Trust.

Centers and Institutes
 Center for Climate, Health, and the Global Environment (Harvard Chan C-CHANGE)
 Jay Winsten Center for Health Communication
 François-Xavier Bagnoud Center for Health and Human Rights
 Harvard Center for Cancer Prevention
 Harvard Center for Population and Development Studies
 Harvard Injury Control Research Center
 Harvard School of Public Health AIDS Initiative (HSPH HAI)
 Cyprus International Institute for Environmental and Public Health
 John B. Little Center for Radiation Sciences

 
Educational institutions established in 1913
1913 establishments in Massachusetts
T.H. Chan School of Public Health
Schools of public health in the United States